Acalolepta artensis is a species of beetle in the family Cerambycidae. It was described by Xavier Montrouzier in 1861, originally under the genus Monochamus. It is known from New Caledonia.

References

Acalolepta
Beetles described in 1861